The Ezra Carpenter House is a historic house at 168 South Street in Foxborough, Massachusetts.  The -story Cape style house was built in 1800 by Ezra Carpenter, a veteran of the American Revolutionary War. Later generations of Carpenters also played significant roles in the civic life of the town. The main block of the house is five bays wide, with a centered entry, and an original central chimney.  The ell to the right is a later 19th century addition.

The house was listed on the National Register of Historic Places in 1985.

See also
National Register of Historic Places listings in Norfolk County, Massachusetts

References

Houses in Norfolk County, Massachusetts
Buildings and structures in Foxborough, Massachusetts
Houses on the National Register of Historic Places in Norfolk County, Massachusetts
Houses completed in 1800